Punjabi Dramas are semi-improvised comedy stage plays popular in the Punjab region of Pakistan.

The plays are scripted but actors and performers are given enough freedom to add humor along the way while staying within boundaries. Punjabi dramas are characterized by taunts which are almost entirely of an adult nature, although this is at many times done through word play which implies something else.

Later on actors of Faisalabad became famous in the scene and choreographed dances on Punjabi film songs were also introduced which increased the popularity of these stage shows considerably. Sometimes the plays also carry a moral.

Audience and popularity 
Punjabi dramas are popular with the lower and middle class and were made famous through distribution on CD's in the mid and late 1990s. Recently, due availability of these dramas on YouTube, they have also become increasingly popular in Punjab region of India.

Genre of comedy
Punjabi dramas are semi-improvisational. Mostly actors keep going on for several minutes, taunting each other.

Women in the stage shows are shown normally of ill repute and this is made very clear through the taunts they get from male actors. Famous people such as Cricket players, Pakistani and Indian film stars and even celebrities from Western culture such as Jackie Chan, Michael Jackson, Colonel Sanders of KFC are used in humor.

Venues and tours
Stage shows are mostly concentrated in Lahore, Faisalabad, Gujranwala and other Punjab cities and also go on tours abroad to the United Kingdom, where stage shows are distributed through DVDs.

Notable persons                                                    
 Murtaza Hassan (Mastana)                         
 Amanullah Khan                   
 Babu Baral
 Sohail Ahmed (Azizi)
 Shoki Khan 
 Khalid Abbas Dar
 Albela (actor)
 Abid Khan
 Ashraf Rahi
 Tariq Javed
 Nasir Chinyoti
 Zafri Khan
 Amanat Chan
 Iftikhar Thakur
 Naseem Vicky
 Tariq Teddy
 Sakhawat Naz
 Agha Majid
 Sajan Abbas
 Javed Kodu
 Sardar Kamal
 Mehmood Khan
 Nawaz Anjum
 Shahid Khan
 Qaiser Piya
 Gulfaam
 Tahir Anjum
 Rangeela

Punjabi culture
Theatre in India